The Himmerland Open was a golf tournament on the Challenge Tour, played in Denmark. It was held from 1994 to 1998 at Himmerland Golf & Spa Resort in Farsø.

Winners

See also
Made in Denmark – European Tour tournament played on the same course from 2014 to 2017 and 2019.

References

External links
Coverage on the Challenge Tour's official site

Former Challenge Tour events
Golf tournaments in Denmark
Recurring sporting events established in 1994
Recurring sporting events disestablished in 1998
1994 establishments in Denmark
1998 disestablishments in Denmark